Daniel Garodnick (born May 5, 1972) is an American lawyer and a former Democratic New York City Councilmember for the 4th district. He is currently the Chair of the New York City Planning Commission. He also serves president and chief executive officer of the Riverside Park Conservancy.

Early life and education
Garodnick was born in New York City and is a graduate of Trinity School (1990). He received his B.A. from Dartmouth College (1994) where he served as class president for each of his four years. He earned a J.D. from the University of Pennsylvania Law School (2000), where he was Editor-in-Chief of the University of Pennsylvania Law Review.

Between college and law school, Garodnick spent time in both Millen, Georgia and Portsmouth, Virginia helping to rebuild African American churches that had been burned by arson. He also spent two years working for the New York Civil Rights Coalition as the director of a program to teach New York City public school ways to combat racial discrimination, and how to use government to effect social change.

Career
An attorney, Garodnick practiced as a litigator at the New York law firm of Paul, Weiss, Rifkind, Wharton & Garrison where he focused on securities litigation and internal investigations of companies. While there, he represented the Partnership for New York City in the successful Campaign for Fiscal Equity lawsuit regarding public school funding.

Prior to joining the firm, he served as a law clerk to Judge Colleen McMahon of the United States District Court for the Southern District of New York. He spent two years working for the New York Civil Rights Coalition.

Personal life
In May 2008, Garodnick married Zoe Segal-Reichlin, senior associate general counsel and director of advocacy of Planned Parenthood. They have two children.

New York City Council
Garodnick was elected to New York City Council in 2005, winning 63 percent of the vote in the general election and defeating both the Republican and Libertarian candidates. In the five-way Democratic primary that year he won 59% of the vote. He won reelection in 2009 and 2013.

During his twelve-year tenure, The New York Times praised Garodnick for his “independent streak” and noted that he had “distinguished himself in the fight to preserve middle-class housing.” The Wall Street Journal has called him “smart and fair” and POLITICO New York noted that he is known as a “policy wonk” who has “bucked the establishment."

In 2017, City & State called Garodnick a “no-nonsense negotiator.” Garodnick earned this reputation for repeatedly bringing parties to an agreement in difficult negotiations. In 2007, Garodnick successfully stepped in to broker an agreement between renowned Chef Daniel Boulud and the staff at his eponymous restaurant, who sought redress and compensation after Asian and Latino employees had been discriminated against and passed over for promotions. In 2008, when a developer proposed rezoning the largest stretch of undeveloped, privately owned land in Manhattan, Garodnick was able to adjust the plan to reduce the height of the towers, provide for acres of gardens and a school, as well as a $10 million contribution from the developer for a pedestrian bridge over the FDR Drive. In 2015, when the de Blasio administration and Council Member Carlos Menchaca were at a logjam over the $115 million redevelopment of the South Brooklyn Marine Terminal, Garodnick helped broker an agreement between both sides.

Garodnick is best known for his work fighting for his childhood home in Stuyvesant Town and Peter Cooper Village, where he spearheaded the largest housing preservation deal in New York City history in 2015, with 5,000 units for middle-class families. He also negotiated the East Midtown Rezoning in 2017, covering an 80 block area in midtown Manhattan, which is expected to generate new commercial space, and to deliver significant public improvements to the area.

Garodnick's last term as councilman ended on December 31, 2017, when he was succeeded by Keith Powers.

Garodnick authored and passed over 60 laws during his tenure on the New York City Council.

New York City Comptroller campaign
On April 3, 2012 Garodnick announced that he would seek the Democratic nomination for New York City Comptroller. On November 28, 2012 Garodnick dropped out of the Comptroller race, and immediately endorsed Scott Stringer, while pledging to run for re-election in District 4. Stringer had previously been running for Mayor. Garodnick was opposed in his bid for re-election by attorney Helene Jnane.

Election history

References

External links
Official campaign site

1972 births
Living people
Dartmouth College alumni
New York City Council members
New York (state) Democrats
Trinity School (New York City) alumni
University of Pennsylvania Law School alumni
Politicians from Manhattan
21st-century American politicians
Paul, Weiss, Rifkind, Wharton & Garrison people